The discography of Danish singer Emmelie de Forest consists of two studio albums, one extended play, and six singles. She represented Denmark with the song "Only Teardrops" in the Eurovision Song Contest 2013 in Malmö, Sweden, winning the contest.

Albums

Extended play

Singles

As lead artist

As featured artist

Writing credits

References

Discographies of Danish artists